The 1910 Fairmount Wheatshockers football team was an American football team that represented Fairmount College (now known as Wichita State University) as an independent during the 1910 college football season. In its second season under head coach Roy K. Thomas, the team compiled a 6–2–1 record and shut out five of nine opponents.

Schedule

References

Fairmount
Wichita State Shockers football seasons
Fairmount Wheatshockers football